David Lee Harrison (born March 13, 1937) is an American children's author and poet.

Professional career
Harrison's poetry, fiction, and nonfiction for young readers have been anthologized in more than 185 books, translated into twelve languages, sandblasted into a library sidewalk, painted on a bookmobile, and presented on television, radio, podcast, and video stream. Ten of his 90 books are professional works for teachers. He is poet laureate of Drury University. David Harrison Elementary School is named after him. He has given keynote talks, college commencement addresses, and been featured at hundreds of conferences, workshops, literature festivals, and schools across America.

He earned a Bachelor of Arts degree from Drury University in 1959, a Master of Science degree from Emory University in 1960, and two Honorary Doctor of Letters degrees. His poetry collection, Pirates, represented Missouri at the 2013 National Book Fair in Washington, D.C.

Work history
 1953–58	Musician: Principal trombonist, symphony orchestra, Springfield, Missouri
 1959–		Writer: stories for adult market; fiction, nonfiction, poetry for children; professional books for teachers
 1960–63	Pharmacologist: Mead Johnson, Evansville, Indiana
 1963–73	Editor/Editorial Manager: Hallmark Cards, Kansas City, Missouri
 1973–2008	Business owner: Glenstone Block Company, Glen Block Hardware stores; Springfield, Branson, Branson West, Camdenton, Kaiser, Missouri
 1984–		Present business co-owner: Gamble’s Gifts, Springfield, Missouri

Bibliography
Poetry 
 1993	Somebody Catch My Homework
 2003	The Mouse Was Out at Recess
 2004	Connecting Dots, Poems of My Journey
 2007	bugs, poems about creeping things
 2008	Pirates
 2009	Vacation, We're Going to the Ocean!
 2012	Cowboys

Fiction 
1969	The Boy with A Drum
1969	Little Turtle’s Big Adventure
1972	The Book of Giant Stories
1986	Wake Up, Sun!
1994	When Cows Come Home
2001	Johnny Appleseed, My Story
2002	Dylan the Eagle-Hearted Chicken
2013	A Perfect Home for a Family	

Nonfiction 
 1970	The World of American Caves
 1981	What Do You Know!
 2001	Caves, Mysteries Beneath Our Feet
 2002	Volcanoes, Nature’s Incredible Fireworks
 2007	Cave Detectives, Unraveling the Mysteries of an Ice Age Cave
 2010	Mammoth Bones and Broken Stones

Professional
 1999	Easy Poetry Lessons that Dazzle and Delight (with Bernice Cullinan)
 2009	Partner Poems for Building Fluency (with Tim Rasinski and Gay Fawcett)
 2013	Learning through Poetry (in 5 volumes) (with Mary Jo Fresch)

Personal information
Harrison and his wife Sandy live in Springfield, Missouri. They have two grown children, Robin (husband Tim and children Kris and Tyler) and Jeff (wife Jennifer).

Honors and awards

 Christopher Award, Christopher Foundation, 1973, for The Book of Giant Stories.
 Award for Outstanding Contributions to Children's Literature, Central State University, 1978.
 Distinguished Alumni Award, Drury College, 1981.
 Kentucky Blue Grass Award nominee, Kentucky State Reading Association, 1993, for Somebody Catch My Homework.
 Celebrate Literacy Award, Springfield Council of the International Reading Association (IRA), 1994 and 2002.
 Celebrate Literacy Award, Missouri State Reading Association, 1994.
 Friend of Education Award, Missouri State Teachers Association, 1994 and 2002.
 Children's Choice Award, IRA/Children's Book Council, 1994, for Somebody Catch My Homework, 1995, for When Cows Come Home, and 1997, for A Thousand Cousins.
 Inclusion on Recommended Reading List, Kansas State Reading Association, 1995, and Master List of Virginia Young Readers Program, Virginia State Reading Association, 1996–97, both for When Cows Come Home.
 IRA Local Council Community Service Award, 2001, for "Sky High on Reading" literacy project.
 Missouri Governor's Humanities Award, 2001.
 The Missourian Award, 2006.

References

Living people
1937 births
American children's writers
American male poets
American non-fiction writers
American male non-fiction writers